Obertraun, Upper Austria is a village in the Salzkammergut, a region in Austria, near the Hallstätter See (Hallstatt Lake) and Hoher Dachstein. It is a popular holiday destination with activities such as skiing and snowboarding in the winter, and mountain biking, swimming and kayaking in the summer.

History
Originally a part of the Duchy of Bavaria, Obertraun became part of the Duchy of Austria during the 12th century. It was occupied several times during the Napoleonic Wars. 
It has been part of Upper Austria since 1918, and an autonomous town since 1921 (after being part of Hallstatt)

Tourism

In 1895 an "association for beautification of the town and advancement of tourism" was founded, and was the starting point for tourism at Obertraun. The first tourists arrived in the town that summer. In 1947 construction of the Dachstein Cablecar began.

Places of interest

Freesports Arena Krippenstein: known as freeride area with more than 30 km offpiste routes. Many possible snowshoe trails. 
Dachstein Caves: including an ice cave and a gigantic limestone cave which can be visited during summer. 
Nature protection area Koppenwinkel

References

Gallery

Cities and towns in Gmunden District